Niklas Ingvarsson (born 3 June 1978) is a Swedish ice sledge hockey player. He plays for FIFH Malmö, and his leg was amputated aged 18, after he suffered from leukemia as a 10-year-old.

He took part in 1998 and 2002, where Sweden won bronze in both. He also participated in the 2010 Winter Paralympics and the 2018 Winter Paralympics.

He also has one World Championship medal; bronze from the 2004 IPC Ice Sledge Hockey World Championships.

References

External links
Profile at Svenska Handikappidrottsförbundet
Profile at Vancouver 2010

Paralympic sledge hockey players of Sweden
Swedish sledge hockey players
1998 Winter Paralympians of Sweden
2002 Winter Paralympians of Sweden
2010 Winter Paralympians of Sweden
2018 Winter Paralympians of Sweden
Ice sledge hockey players at the 1998 Winter Paralympics
Ice sledge hockey players at the 2002 Winter Paralympics
Ice sledge hockey players at the 2010 Winter Paralympics
Para ice hockey players at the 2018 Winter Paralympics
1978 births
Living people
Medalists at the 1998 Winter Paralympics
Paralympic medalists in sledge hockey
Paralympic bronze medalists for Sweden
20th-century Swedish people
21st-century Swedish people